Bole is a roasted plantain dish in Nigeria. It is native to the Yoruba people of Nigeria. It is referred to as 'boli' in South West Nigeria these people are known as the Yoruba people and is eaten with groundnuts. The Yorubas have been enjoying this delicacy for ages, it can be consumed as a snack or main meal which can be accompanied with pepper sauce filled with meat, roasted fish or fried chicken especially during the festive period. The word 'boli' is being pronounced as 'bole' due to a difference in accent in the south-south region in Nigeria.  In  South South Nigeria,  it is referred to as 'bole' a borrowed language from the southwestern people in Nigeria and is eaten with fish during an important festival.

References

External links
YouTube video of preparation

Nigerian cuisine
Igbo cuisine
Snack foods
Plantain dishes
Yoruba cuisine